Rumworth is an electoral ward of Bolton, in Greater Manchester, England. The population of this ward at the 2011 census was 16,250. Historically it was part of the hundred of Salford in Lancashire and centre of the Parish of  Deane which once covered roughly half of the present Metropolitan Borough of Bolton. St Mary's Church on which the parish was centred was in the township of Rumworth.

History
Rumworth was recorded as Rumhworth in 1242, Rumworth in 1278, Rumwrth in 1292 and Romeworthe in 1346.

Rumworth was joined with Lostock as the third part of a knight's fee in 1212, held by the lords of the manor of Manchester. Later the Andertons of Lostock claimed a manor in Rumworth where there were fourteen oxgangs of land. The manor was bought by the Hultons of Over Hulton and it descended in this family. Sir Charles Tempest, the heir of the Andertons, had a large estate in the township. Contributors to the land tax in 1789 were Henry Blundell, who paid the largest share, Blackburne, and William Hulton.

The population in the area increased in the 19th century as a result of the coal mines and erection of a cotton-mill and of weaving sheds.

Governance
Rumworth township was the centre of  the ancient parish of Deane, it was the township in which the parish church was situated.  It was included in Bolton Poor Law Union in 1837, and became part of Bolton Rural Sanitary Authority in 1870. In 1872, Rumworth was divided into two parts; the eastern portion was added to the Borough of Bolton (Rumworth Ward), and the western part remained in Bolton Rural Sanitary Authority. In 1894, the western portion became a civil parish in Bolton Rural District, and its name was changed to 'Deane'. In 1898, the Rural District Council was abolished, and Deane became part of Bolton County Borough Deane-cum-Lostock Ward.

Geography

The Church Brook flows down Deane Clough to join the River Croal which forms the northern boundary. To the west of the township is the Rumworth Lodge Reservoir. The Bolton to Wigan road passes Deane Church and to the east the Bolton to Leigh passes through Daubhill.

References
Notes

Geography of the Metropolitan Borough of Bolton
Areas of Greater Manchester
History of the Metropolitan Borough of Bolton